The 2013 Oceania Athletics Championships were held at the Stade Pater Te Hono Nui in Papeete, French Polynesia, between June 3–5, 2013.  The event was held jointly with the 2013 Oceania Youth Athletics Championships, and there were also exhibition events for masters, athletes with a disability and children.  Detailed reports on a day by day basis were given.

The event was overshadowed by the death of New Zealand racewalker Lesley Cantwell.  She collapsed while waiting for the medal ceremony after winning the gold medal in the 5000 metres race walk event, and was taken to Papeete Hospital on life support. However, she died a few days later.

In the open division, a total of 44 events were contested, 21 by men and 22 by women, as well as 1 mixed medley relay.

Medal summary
Complete results can be found on the Oceania Athletics Association webpage.

Men

Women

Mixed

Medal table (unofficial)

Participation (unofficial)
The participation of 480 athletes representing 24 teams from 22 countries was published.  The list comprises also the U-18 athletes, some of them competed in
both the open and the youth event, especially in the relays.

20 of the participating teams were OAA members, one team an associate OAA member, only Niue was absent.

In addition, there was a team from Wallis and Futuna, which is no OAA member, and two regional teams: A local team dubbed "Tahiti West Coast" (TWC in the results list, here dubbed TAH) and a "Regional Australia Team" (RAT in the results list, here dubbed NAUS)
 including athletes with "their normal place of residence in Northern Australia (defined as comprising the Northern Territory and any parts of Western Australia and Queensland, north of 26th parallel south latitude)." 

 (5)
 (42)
 (5)
 (6)
 (29)
 (9)
 (4)
 (2)
 (5)
 (5)
 (7)
 (51)
 (1)
/ North Australia (16)
 (5)
 (4)
 (8)
 (4)
 (4)
 Tahiti West Coast (42)
 (6)
 (3)
 (6)
/ (6)

References

Oceania Athletics Championships
Athletics competitions in French Polynesia
Oceania Athletics Championships
Oceania Athletics Championships
International sports competitions hosted by French Polynesia
June 2013 sports events in Oceania